Sheykh Boran (also Romanized as Sheykh Borān) is a village in Chahardangeh Rural District, Hurand District, Ahar County, East Azerbaijan Province, Iran. At the 2006 census, its population was 51, in 13 families.

References 

Populated places in Ahar County